Fotballklubben Eik Tønsberg Allianseidrettslag (formerly known as Eik-Tønsberg), is a Norwegian football club from the Eik neighborhood of Tønsberg, Vestfold. The club got its current name on 1 January 2020 after a merger with FK Tønsberg. The football team competes with the name FK Eik Tønsberg 871 where the number represents the founding year of the town of Tønsberg.

History

The club was founded as Eik Idrettsforening on 14 March 1928, and included the city name Tønsberg in 1989. Before 1988, the district Eik was located in Sem municipality, but Sem was incorporated into Tønsberg.

It was formerly a team of nationwide importance. The team played their first season in the Norwegian top division in the 1957–58 season and finished in sixth place out of eight teams in group B. In the 1959–60 season they finished second in the Main League group B, reaching a bronze play-off match which they won 4–2 against Vålerengen. Since this was the first time a bronze play-off was held, Eik became the first bronze medalists in Norwegian football's top division. In the following 1960–61 season they won the Main League group B, reaching a gold playoff match which they lost to Fredrikstad. Well-known players were Arne Natland, Arne Høivik and Tore Halvorsen, all of whom were capped by Norway.

Eik were promoted to the Norwegian top flight in 1982, finished fifth in 1983, and were relegated in 1985. Among the profiles on this team were midfielder Geir "Bolla" Johansen and striker Nick Sandberg, both of whom played briefly on the international stage, as well as future Tottenham goalkeeper Erik Thorstvedt who left the club after the 1983 season.

In the 1990s the team was a mainstay in the 1. divisjon, the second tier. After the 1997 season it even contested a playoff to win promotion to the Tippeligaen, but did not win. The team was relegated after the 2000 1. divisjon season, and played in the 2001 2. divisjon.

Merger with FK Tønsberg

On 10 October 2001, a new club was founded. FK Tønsberg was to be an umbrella team in the district, and was supported by 20 teams in the region. As Eik-Tønsberg was the best regional team, FK Tønsberg took their place in the league system from 2002 and Eik-Tønsberg started anew.

Eik-Tønsberg won their 3. divisjon group in both 2003, 2004 and 2005, but in each year it succumbed to other clubs in the promotion playoffs. In 2010 the club also contested the playoffs as the 2nd placed team, but was again defeated, and remained in the 3. divisjon. It was relegated to the 4. divisjon after the 2012 season. The club was promoted back to the 3. divisjon for the 2015 season, but was relegated again in 2016. After the 2020 merger with FK Tønsberg, Eik Tønsberg advanced a tier since FK Tønsberg played in the 3. divisjon at the time.

Recent seasons

Sources:

References

External links
 Official site 

Football clubs in Norway
Eliteserien clubs
Sport in Vestfold og Telemark
Tønsberg
Association football clubs established in 1928
1928 establishments in Norway